The Apex Town Hall, called Apex City Hall in the National Register of Historic Places is a historic town hall at 237 N Salem Street in the historic district of downtown Apex, North Carolina.  It was built in 1912 after the June 12, 1911, fire destroyed several downtown buildings including the previous home of the town hall, Poe Brother's Store.

The ground floor housed a farmer's market with fresh meat preserved by ice boxes, vegetables, chickens on the sidewalk out front, and two jail cells, segregated by race.  Upstairs had an auditorium, opera stage, dressing rooms and the mayor's office.  The building was heated by wood stoves and lighted by oil lamps.

The auditorium hosted silent movies, Chautauquas, dramas, and other community cultural events.

The Apex Volunteer Fire Department was formed in 1927 and took its first residence the town hall, parking a fire engine in the left bay of the building, which parked there through 1957.  The Fire Department built a separate building across the street in 1958.

Apex had a public works building attached to the back for a time, but it was removed to make parking spaces.

The DMV had an office in the building for a time.

The Town Hall function moved from the building in 1978 to 205 Saunders St.   The building was condemned.  The town refurbished it and it served as home to the Apex Parks and Recreation department through 2007.

Halle Cultural Arts Center
The Halle Cultural Arts Center has occupied the building since dedication January 10, 2008.  It offers an art gallery downstairs and a performance hall upstairs, with the original flooring from the original auditorium.

Additions to the building include a glass-enclosed grand staircase and elevator on the south side and an extension on the back.

The renovations were recognized by the AIA-Triangle Merit Award  and the 2008 Anthemion Award from Capital Area Preservation.

See also
 Apex Historic District
 List of Registered Historic Places in North Carolina

References

Apex, North Carolina
City and town halls in North Carolina
City and town halls on the National Register of Historic Places in North Carolina
Government buildings completed in 1912
Tourist attractions in Apex, North Carolina
Buildings and structures in Wake County, North Carolina
National Register of Historic Places in Wake County, North Carolina
1912 establishments in North Carolina